A statue of Joseph Bryan was installed in Richmond, Virginia's Monroe Park, in the United States. The memorial was removed in July 2020.

See also
 List of monuments and memorials removed during the George Floyd protests

References

Buildings and structures in Richmond, Virginia
Monuments and memorials in Virginia
Outdoor sculptures in Richmond, Virginia
Sculptures of men in Virginia
Statues in Virginia
Statues removed in 2020
Monuments and memorials in Virginia removed during the George Floyd protests